René Acht (24 March 1920 Basel, Switzerland – 3 May 1998 Herbolzheim, Germany) was a Swiss painter and graphic artist.

References

20th-century Swiss painters
20th-century Swiss male artists
Swiss male painters
1920 births
1998 deaths